Gledhow is a western suburb of Albany in southern Western Australia. Its local government area is the City of Albany.  The suburb has a median age of 38.

References

Suburbs of Albany, Western Australia